Prince Mohammed Ibn Salman Ibn Abdul Aziz Road, formerly Prince Saud bin Muhammad bin Muqrin Road, is a 30 km commercial road in northern Riyadh, Saudi Arabia that runs from the Hittin neighborhood to al-Rimal neighborhood and links King Khalid Road from the west and al-Janadriyah Road to the east. It was renamed after Mohammed bin Salman, the crown prince of Saudi Arabia through a royal decree issued by King Salman in March 2019.

References 

Roads in Saudi Arabia